Ricardo Bravo Oliva is a Chilean civil engineer and politician who served as Intendant of the Valparaíso Region.

Political career
During the whole Michelle Bachelet's first government (2006-2010), he held the position of Governor of Valparaíso.

In 2011, he registered his candidacy with Abel Gallardo at the headquarters of the Socialist Party of Chile to compete with the then mayor of Valparaíso Jorge Castro in the 2012 Chilean municipal election. However, he declined his participation.

In 2013, now he announced his candidacy for deputy for 14th District of Viña del Mar and Concón. However, he was defeated by his list partner, Rodrigo González Torres (PPD). Similarly, he also was defeated by the UDI candidate Osvaldo Urrutia. The following year he was appointed regional mayor of Valparaíso by Bachelet in her second government. In 2015, he supported the unsuccessful candidacy of Camilo Escalona for the presidency of the PS during the internal elections of that year.

Electoral record

References

External Links
 Fenatrapochi Profile 

1964 births
Living people 
21st-century Chilean politicians
Pontifical Catholic University of Valparaíso alumni
Socialist Party of Chile politicians
Intendants of Valparaíso Region
People from Valparaíso